Herbert Gruber (1913 in Vienna – 1999 in Vienna) was an Austrian film producer.

After gaineing a doctorate in law from the University of Vienna he worked as a lawyer for some years. Following the Second World War he began working for Austria's biggest film company Sascha Film, and in the mid-1950s he became head of production. Gruber held the position for around a decade, overseeing in particular a number of popular comedies starring Peter Alexander.

Selected filmography

 Bruder Martin (1954)
 Dunja (1955)
 Marriage Sanitarium (1955)
 Crown Prince Rudolph's Last Love (1956)
 Kaiserjäger (1956)
 The Saint and Her Fool (1957)
 Vienna, City of My Dreams (1957)
 The Priest and the Girl (1958)
 Arena of Fear (1959)
 Twelve Girls and One Man (1959)
 Mikosch of the Secret Service (1959)
 Crime Tango (1960)
 The White Horse Inn (1960)
 Guitars Sound Softly Through the Night (1960)
 Mariandl (1961)
 Season in Salzburg (1961)
 The Adventures of Count Bobby (1961)
  Die Fledermaus (1962)
 Wedding Night in Paradise (1962)
 The Sweet Life of Count Bobby (1962)
 Waldrausch (1962)
 The Merry Widow (1962)
 Mariandl's Homecoming (1962)
 An Alibi for Death (1963)
 The Model Boy (1963)
 Charley's Aunt (1963)
 Schweik's Awkward Years (1964)
 Help, My Bride Steals (1964)
 In Bed by Eight (1965)
 Heidi (1965)

References

Bibliography
 Franz Antel & Christian F. Winkler. Hollywood an der Donau: Geschichte der Wien-Film in Sievering. Verlag d. Österr. Staatsdr., 1991.

External links

1913 births
1999 deaths
20th-century Austrian lawyers
Austrian film producers
Film people from Vienna